Meat carving is the process and skill of cutting portions of meat, such as roast and poultry, to obtain a maximum or satisfactory number of meat portions, using a carving knife or meat-slicing machine. A meat carver disjoints the meat and slices in uniform portions. Meat carving is sometimes considered a skill for the private dinner table.

See also
Butcher
 Cut of beef
Cleaver (knife)
Ground meat
Meatpacking

Meat industry
Cutting techniques (cooking)